Frank Sikes Airport  is a city-owned public-use airport located two nautical miles (3.7 km) north of the central business district of Luverne, a city in Crenshaw County, Alabama, United States.

Facilities and aircraft 
It has one runway designated 4/22 with an asphalt surface measuring 4,640 by 80 feet (1,414 x 24 m). For the 12-month period ending December 9, 2008, the airport had 5,636 aircraft operations, an average of 15 per day.

References

External links 
 Aerial image as of 2 April 1992 from USGS The National Map
 Airfield photos for 04A from Civil Air Patrol

Airports in Alabama
Buildings and structures in Crenshaw County, Alabama
Transportation in Crenshaw County, Alabama